Jane Visvader  is a scientist specialising in breast cancer research who works for the Walter and Eliza Hall Institute in Melbourne, Australia.  She is the joint head of the Breast Cancer Laboratory with Geoff Lindeman.

Education 
Visvader holds a PhD in Biochemistry from the University of Adelaide having studied structure and function of citrus exocortis viroid

Career and research
After her PhD, she was a postdoctoral researcher with Inder Verma (Salk Institute, San Diego) and Jerry Adams (Walter and Eliza Hall Institute (WEHI)). She worked at the Children's Hospital/Harvard Medical School in Boston before returning to Victoria in 1997 to establish a Breast Cancer Laboratory at WEHI.

Visvader has published work investigating the role of cells of origin in cancer and in particular focuses on the role of stem cells, which she believes may be a key to understanding breast cancer.

Patents
Visvader is a named inventor on five patents relating to cancer research focused on stem cell isolation and diagnostics.

Method Of Cell Isolation, Application number: 20080038230
Differentiation and/or proliferation modulating agents and uses therefor, Application number: 20060166917
Novel phosphoprotein, Application number: 20060148032
Method of diagnosis and treatment and agents useful for same, Application number: 20050048528
Differentiation and/or proliferation modulating agents and uses therefor, Application number: 20030175971

Recognition
2020 Fellow of the Royal Society (FRS).
2019 Komen Brinker Award for Scientific Distinction (Joint with Geoff Lindeman)
2017 Victoria Prize for Science & Innovation (Joint with Geoff Lindeman) 
2016 National Health and Medical Research Council Elizabeth Blackburn Fellowship 
2016 Lemberg Medal, Australian Society for Biochemistry and Molecular Biology 
2016 Fellowship of the Australian Academy of Health and Medical Sciences 
2014 Royal Society of Victoria Research Medal for Scientific Excellence in Biomedical & Health Sciences.
 2012 Fellow of the Australian Academy of Science 
2008 GlaxoSmithKline Award for Research Excellence (Joint with Geoff Lindeman)

References

Year of birth missing (living people)
Living people
Australian women academics
Fellows of the Australian Academy of Science
Australian women scientists
Cancer researchers
Fellows of the Australian Academy of Health and Medical Sciences
Female Fellows of the Royal Society
WEHI alumni